Braga Airport  is an airport in Palmeira,  north northwest of Braga, Portugal.

See also
 Transport in Portugal
 List of airports in Portugal

References

Airports in Portugal
Buildings and structures in Braga